Gatehead railway station was a railway station serving the village of Gatehead, East Ayrshire, Scotland.

History 
The station was opened on 6 July 1812 by the Kilmarnock and Troon Railway. The Glasgow, Paisley, Kilmarnock and Ayr Railway took over management of the station (and its line) on 16 July 1846, while its successor, the Glasgow and South Western Railway, took over full ownership in 1899. The station closed on 3 March 1969.

Today Gatehead station has a single platform intact (although overgrown). The line is still open as part of the Glasgow South Western Line and the station's level crossing is still in use, allowing road traffic on the A759 to cross the line.

Laigh Milton Viaduct, Scotland's oldest railway viaduct, is nearby, but not in use as the railway was realigned in 1846.

Views of the railway at Gatehead

References

Notes

Sources 
 
 
 

Disused railway stations in East Ayrshire
Railway stations in Great Britain opened in 1812
Railway stations in Great Britain closed in 1969
Beeching closures in Scotland
Former Glasgow and South Western Railway stations